Biscayne Lady is a double-hull catamaran passenger vessel registered in Miami, Florida. The boat was built by Austal USA shipbuilders in 2002. Home-docked at Bayside Marina, Biscayne Lady is a venue for private event charters. The yacht operates from most major marinas in South Florida.

Biscayne Lady Yacht Charters consists of Biscayne Lady and one sister vessel named . The company is a subsidiary of Island Queen Cruises & Tours which owns and operates several smaller sightseeing vessels, also home-docked within Bayside Marina.

In October 2018, Miami-Dade police conducted a full-scale active shooter drill onboard Biscayne Lady.

References

2003 ships
Individual yachts
Passenger ships of the United States
Ships built in Mobile, Alabama